Mary Byfield (baptized 11 November 1795 – 1871) was an English book illustrator and wood engraver.

Biography
Byfield was born in London into a family of wood engravers. Taught by their father, Mary Byfield often worked with her brothers John (1788-1841) and Ebenezer (1790-1817) to produce engraved illustrations for books. These included several volumes for the writer Thomas Frognall Dibdin. Mary and John Byfield also produced illustrations for the Chiswick Press, notably for the works of William Pickering. Working alone, Mary Byfield also produced engravings for several other volumes and designed a version of the Oxford University arms that became, for a time, the mark of the Oxford University Press. She worked for the printer Charles Whittingham and his nephew, Charles at the Chiswick Press throughout her life. As well as full page illustrations, her work included engraved alphabets for the first letter of a page, head and tail pieces, decorative borders and vignettes. Byfield taught several other members of her family, and members of the Whittingham family, wood engraving techniques. For most of her life, Byfield lived in the Holloway area of London, notably at Canonbury Place and Liverpool Road.

Works illustrated
Works illustrated in whole, or part, by Mary Byfield include,

 Bibliotheca Spenciana by Thomas Frognal Dibdin, 1814, 4 volumes, with John Byfield
 Bibliographical Decameron, 1817, with John Byfield
 Typographical Antiquities by Thomas Frognal Dibdin, 1819
 Icones veteris testamenti, 1830, with John Byfield
 South Yorkshire by Joseph Hunter, 1831
 The Dance of Death by Francis Douce, 1833, with John Byfield
 Reminiscences of a Literary Life, 1836, with John Byfield
 Memorials of Cambridge by Orlando Jewitt, 1841
 A Summer's Day at Windsor, or A Visit to Eton by Edward Jesse, 1841
 Bibliotheca Spenciana by Thomas Frognal Dibdin, 1842
 History of the Orders of Knighthood by Nicolas, 1842
 First Book of Elements of Euclid, 1847
 Queen Elizabeth's Prayer Book of 1569, 1853.

References

External links

 Works by Byfield in the British Museum print collection

1795 births
1871 deaths
19th-century British printmakers
19th-century English women artists
19th-century engravers
Artists from London
English wood engravers
Sibling artists
Women engravers